The Darrah House and Water Tank House, near Shoshone, Idaho, were built in 1913 by sheep rancher and stonemason Bill Darrah. They was listed on the National Register of Historic Places in 1983.

The house is a one-and-a-half-story stone house with a truncated pyramidal roof.

References

Agricultural buildings and structures on the National Register of Historic Places
Buildings and structures in Lincoln County, Idaho
Agricultural buildings and structures on the National Register of Historic Places in Idaho
Infrastructure completed in 1913
1913 establishments in Idaho
National Register of Historic Places in Lincoln County, Idaho
Lava rock buildings and structures
Water tanks on the National Register of Historic Places